Herman I of Baden (c. 1040 – April 25, 1074 in Cluny) was the titular Margrave of Verona and the ancestor of the line of Margraves of Baden.

Life
Herman was born in Freiburg im Breisgau as the eldest son of Berthold I of Zähringen. He married Judit of Backnang-Sulichgau, Countess of Eberstein-Calw, who was the founder of Hirsau Abbey. From her, he obtained the right to Baden, which later became the core of the family dominions. Among those lands were the Frankish Albgau and Ufgau.

He and his wife founded the Augustinian monastery of Backnang Abbey. It quickly became dilapidated, and it was rebuilt by their son in 1123. Subsequently, the monastery was the resting place for five generations of the Margraves of Baden.

When Herman's father became Duke of Carinthia in 1061, Herman received the courtesy title of Margrave of Verona. While he never ruled in Verona, a dependency of Carinthia, the margravial title was to remain with his descendants. He was also count of the Breisgau.

In 1073, he separated from his wife, took monastic vows, and became a lay brother in Cluny Abbey, where he died. He is celebrated in the Catholic Church on April 25.

Herman and Judit had the following children:
 Hermann II (d. October 8, 1130)
 Luitgard

Sources
 

Margraves of Baden
House of Zähringen
1040s births
1074 deaths
Year of birth uncertain
Burials at Cluny Abbey